State Route 19 (SR 19) is a north–south route in northern and central Ohio.  Its southern terminus is at U.S. Route 42 in the unincorporated village of Williamsport, and its northern terminus is at State Route 2 north of Oak Harbor.

History
The current State Route 19 was certified in 1932 and originally went from Galion to Oak Harbor, going through Fremont on State Street (U.S. Route 20) and Stone Street.  The route was extended in the north to State Route 2 in 1938, and in the south to U.S. Route 42 in 1939.  In 1960, State Route 19 was rerouted around Fremont along with U.S. Route 20, U.S. Route 6, and State Route 53 (Ohio) via a freeway bypass.

The route number 19 was used for the route of an original state highway that went from Columbus to the Pennsylvania state line.  This route is now the eastern Ohio portion of U.S. Route 62.  The route number was then given to the route of the former State Route 62, which the U.S. highway system had made defunct.

Major intersections

References

External links

019
Transportation in Morrow County, Ohio
Transportation in Crawford County, Ohio
Transportation in Seneca County, Ohio
Transportation in Sandusky County, Ohio
Transportation in Ottawa County, Ohio